Barbara, Lady Stephen (1872–1945) was an English educational writer and Florence Nightingale's cousin.

She was born Margaret Thyra Barbara Shore Smith (later Shore Nightingale). Margaret studied History at Girton College, Cambridge, 1891–1894. In 1904 she married Harry Lushington Stephen, later Sir Harry Stephen (1860–1945). In India with her husband 1904–1913, she founded the Women Graduates Union in Calcutta for the benefit of professional women coming to India. She was a member of Girton College Council 1913–1932, Governor of Girton College 1913–1938, and a generous benefactor of Girton Library.

Works
Emily Davies and Girton College, 1927.
Girton College 1869-1932, Cambridge University Press, Cambridge, 1932. 167p.

References

External links
Barbara E. Megson, ‘Stephen , (Margaret Thyra) Barbara, Lady Stephen (1872–1945)’, Oxford Dictionary of National Biography, Oxford University Press, Sept 2004; online edn, Oct 2007, accessed 2 Jan 2008
Portrait of Lady Stephen by Charles Haslewood Shannon at Art UK

English women non-fiction writers
1872 births
1945 deaths
Alumni of Girton College, Cambridge
English non-fiction writers
20th-century English women writers
20th-century English non-fiction writers
Wives of baronets